Ali Adde is an administrative district in the Ali Sabieh Region of Djibouti.

See also 

 Districts of Djibouti

References 

Districts of Djibouti